Inquisitor flemingi is an extinct species of sea snail, a marine gastropod mollusk in the family Pseudomelatomidae, the turrids and allies.

Description
The length of the shell attains 16.3 mm, its diameter 6.4 mm.

Distribution
This extinct marine species was found in middle Tongaporutuan strata of New Zealand.

References

 Maxwell, P.A. (2009). Cenozoic Mollusca. pp 232–254 in Gordon, D.P. (ed.) New Zealand inventory of biodiversity. Volume one. Kingdom Animalia: Radiata, Lophotrochozoa, Deuterostomia. Canterbury University Press, Christchurch

External links
 Vella, Paul. "Tertiary Mollusca from south-east Wairarapa." Transactions of the Royal Society of New Zealand. Vol. 81. No. 4. 1954.

flemingi
Gastropods described in 1954
Gastropods of New Zealand